The Dwarka is a Metro Station is located on the Blue Line and Grey Line of the Delhi Metro. The Station is an interchange station between the lines.

Station layout

Facilities
List of available ATM at Dwarka metro station are Oriental Bank of Commerce, State Bank of India.

References
  

Delhi Metro stations
Railway stations opened in 2005
Railway stations in South West Delhi district
Railway stations in India opened in 2019